The Viking Queen is a 1967 Hammer adventure film directed by Don Chaffey and starring Don Murray. It is set in Roman Britain.

The title of the film caused much confusion, because there are no Norse Vikings in the movie. However, there is another meaning of the word "viking": a raider or plunderer, of which there are many such characters in this film. In addition, "viking" was understood internationally, having been recently used in other film titles.

Plot summary
According to her father's wishes, Queen Salina agrees to share the rule of Icena with Justinian, a Roman. This decision angers both the bloodthirsty Druids and Romans less just than Justinian. As the two rulers fall in love, the Druids and the Romans begin to plot their downfall. It's not long before the hills of Britain are stained with the blood of the lovers' followers.

The plot combines elements of life of the historic queen Boudica (featuring the Iceni tribe, combat chariots) with elements seemingly drawn from Vincenzo Bellini's opera Norma, though that is set in Gaul, and William Shakespeare's King Lear.

Cast

 Don Murray as Justinian 
 Carita as Salina 
 Donald Houston as Maelgan 
 Andrew Keir as Octavian 
 Adrienne Corri as Beatrice 
 Niall MacGinnis as Tiberian 
 Wilfrid Lawson as King Priam 
 Nicola Pagett as Talia 
 Percy Herbert as Catus 
 Patrick Troughton as Tristram
 Sean Caffrey as Fergus
 Denis Shaw as Osiris
 Philip O'Flynn as Merchant
 Brendan Matthews as Nigel
 Gerry Alexander as Fabian
 Patrick Gardiner as Benedict
 Paul Murphy as Dalon, Maelgan's Son
 Arthur O'Sullivan as Old Man at Tax-Enquiry
 Cecil Sheridan as Shopkeeper at Protest Gathering
 Anna Manahan as Shopkeeper's Wife
 Nita Lorraine as Nubian Slave Girl

Production
The film was budgeted at £350,000 and went over budget by £61,000.

During filming in Ireland, Patrick Troughton, who was playing the part of Tristram, was offered the role of the Second Doctor in Doctor Who. Eventually, he accepted.

Reception
The Viking Queen was given mixed reviews on its original release while it performed poorly at the box office.

For a much later television screening, David Parkinson in the Radio Times thought the film used "a story that would struggle to get a pass grade in GCSE English."; while in TV Guide a reviewer wrote that it is "an interesting, well-photographed attempt to depict the land of the blue-painted troglodytes...The costumes reveal more flesh than might have been wise in the cold, damp climate of the Irish mountains where location scenes were shot."

Box Office
According to Fox records, the film needed to earn $1,625,000 in rentals to break even and made $835,000, meaning it made a loss.

References

External links
 
 

1960s historical adventure films
1967 films
British historical adventure films
Cultural depictions of Boudica
1960s English-language films
Films directed by Don Chaffey
Films set in the Roman Empire
Films set in the 1st century
Hammer Film Productions films
1960s British films